The Parley of Instruments takes its name from some of the earliest public concerts in the world, given in London in 1676 by the violinist John Banister. The Parley was founded in 1979—long experience in the scholarship and performance of 17th and 18th century music are brought together in their specialist areas of string and continuo performance practice. Many years of working together have produced a 'house style' that is consistent and well thought-out through a combination of experimentation with historical techniques and experience.

Founded to play the rich repertory of Renaissance and Baroque string consort music, The Parley subsequently created the first Renaissance violin consort in modern times. With light internal construction, plain gut strings and short bows, Renaissance violins produce a more blended, viol-like sound than the more familiar Baroque models. The Parley now offers a complete orchestral Renaissance violin band, suitable for the music of Praetorius, Monteverdi, Lully, Biber, Purcell and many others.

The Parley's trail-blazing work in English eighteenth-century music has led to the formation of a Baroque and Classical orchestra, and to collaborations with famous soloists such as Catherine Bott, Michael Chance, Ian Partridge, Stephen Varcoe, Crispian Steele-Perkins, Elizabeth Wallfisch and Paul O'Dette. In 1996 the Parley moved into the nineteenth-century with performances and recordings of English parish church music in the 'gallery' tradition with the choir Psalmody.

The Parley tours regularly in Britain and abroad and has made over 60 broadcasts for BBC Radio 3 and numerous critically acclaimed recordings for Hyperion Records. Peter Holman is an acknowledged authority on the early violin and its music and the group has given hundreds of first modern performances of pieces edited by him.

Discography
The Parley of Instruments has an extensive discography spanning 30 years, including many recordings of lesser-known English baroque music in the English Orpheus series of Hyperion Records. The ensemble now records on the Chandos Classics label.

References

External links
 http://www.parley.org.uk/ Official Site

Early music groups